Kostas Mendrinos (born 28 May 1985) is a Greek professional footballer who plays as a midfielder for Keratsini. He has previously played for Olympiacos, Atromitos, Ionikos, PAS Giannina, Aris, Panachaiki and Panionios.

Club career
Mendrinos started his career at the youth teams of Olympiacos, where he broke into the first team in 2002. He left Olympiakos on 27 April 2009, after a disagreement with the club for renewal of his contract. He joined PAS Giannina on 27 May 2009, but left in May 2010, shortly after his team was relegated to next season's Football League.

Mendrinos joined Aris on 15 June 2010. He was released from the Thessaloniki club in late June of the following year after reports involving him in attempting to manipulate a UEFA Europa League match's kick-off against Manchester City. In September 2011 he joined Football League side Panachaiki and on 16 January 2012 he moved to Superleague side Panionios. At the end of 2013, Mendrinos has announced a 1,5 year contract with Platanias. On 27 May 2015, he renewed his contract with the club till the summer of 2017. On 23 May 2017 Apollon Smyrni announced that Mendrinos would join them on a free transfer after the expiry of his contract. On 7 August 2018, he joined Iraklis on a two-year contract.

Until the end of 2013 Mendrinos has 11 international appearances with Olympiakos and Aris in UEFA Champions League and UEFA Europa League.

Honours

Club
Olympiacos
Super League Greece (3): 2006–07, 2007–08, 2008–09
Greek Cup (2): 2007–08, 2008–09
Greek Super Cup: 2007

References

External links
Guardian Football profile

1985 births
Living people
Greek footballers
Olympiacos F.C. players
Aris Thessaloniki F.C. players
Atromitos F.C. players
Ionikos F.C. players
PAS Giannina F.C. players
Panachaiki F.C. players
Panionios F.C. players
Association football midfielders
Footballers from Piraeus